Bernalillo Public Schools is a school district headquartered in Bernalillo, New Mexico.

History

As of 1970 Hispanic and Latino people are the majority ethnic group in the area. Prior to 1969 the school board had five members. To encourage elections of members of non-Hispanic groups, in 1969 the number of board members increased to seven. The two new board members included an American Indian and a non-Hispanic white person.

Bernalillo High School alumnus Matthew Montaño became the superintendent in 2021.

Service area
It service area includes most of Bernalillo as well as Algodones, Cochiti, Cochiti Lake, La Madera, Peña Blanca, Placitas, Pueblo of Sandia Village, San Felipe Pueblo, Santo Domingo Pueblo, and most of Santa Ana Pueblo.

Schools
 High schools
 Bernalillo High School

 K-8 schools
 Cochiti Elementary and Middle Schools
 Santo Domingo Elementary and Middle Schools

 Middle schools
 Bernalillo Middle School

 Elementary schools
 W. D. Carroll Elementary School
 Placitas Elementary School

 Preschool
 La Escuelita Preschool ("Escuelita" means "Little School" in Spanish)

References

External links
 Bernalillo Public Schools

Education in Sandoval County, New Mexico
School districts in New Mexico